Schley County is a county located in the west central portion of the U.S. state of Georgia. (Schley is properly pronounced "sly", as this is the correct pronunciation of Governor William Schley, for whom the county is named).  As of the 2020 census, the county's population was 4,547. The county seat is Ellaville.

Schley County is part of the Americus, GA Micropolitan Statistical Area.

History
The county was created by an act of the Georgia General Assembly on December 22, 1857, and is named for William Schley, United States Representative and thirty-sixth governor of Georgia.

The first county courthouse was built in 1858. The present Schley County Courthouse dates from 1899.

Geography

The central portion of Schley County, roughly north of Ellaville, is located in the Middle Flint River sub-basin of the ACF River Basin (Apalachicola-Chattahoochee-Flint River Basin).  The very northern border area of the county is located in the Upper Flint River sub-basin of the same  ACF River Basin. The southwestern portion of Schley County, southwest of Ellaville, is located in the Kinchafoonee-Muckalee sub-basin of the same larger ACF River Basin.

Major highways
  U.S. Route 19
  State Route 3
  State Route 26
  State Route 153
  State Route 228
  State Route 240
  State Route 271

Adjacent counties
 Taylor County (north)
 Macon County (east)
 Sumter County (south)
 Marion County (west)

Demographics

2000 census
As of the census of 2000, there were 7,329 people, 1,435 households, and 1,041 families living in the county.  The population density was 22 people per square mile (9/km2).  There were 1,612 housing units at an average density of 10 per square mile (4/km2).  The racial makeup of the county was 59.28% White, 37.77% Black or African American, 0.21% Native American, 0.08% Asian, 0.16% Pacific Islander, 1.35% from other races, and 1.14% from two or more races.  2.36% of the population were Hispanic or Latino of any race.

There were 1,435 households, out of which 36.30% had children under the age of 18 living with them, 52.10% were married couples living together, 15.70% had a female householder with no husband present, and 27.40% were non-families. 24.80% of all households were made up of individuals, and 11.30% had someone living alone who was 65 years of age or older.  The average household size was 2.62 and the average family size was 3.11.

In the county, the population was spread out, with 29.30% under the age of 18, 8.20% from 18 to 24, 27.50% from 25 to 44, 24.00% from 45 to 64, and 11.10% who were 65 years of age or older.  The median age was 34 years. For every 100 females, there were 91.80 males.  For every 100 females age 18 and over, there were 88.70 males.

The median income for a household in the county was $32,035, and the median income for a family was $36,215. Males had a median income of $29,239 versus $19,952 for females. The per capita income for the county was $14,981.  About 15.80% of families and 19.90% of the population were below the poverty line, including 26.00% of those under age 18 and 22.70% of those age 65 or over.

2010 census
As of the 2010 United States Census, there were 5,010 people, 1,872 households, and 1,334 families living in the county. The racial makeup of the county was 63.0% white, 33.3% black or African American, 0.7% Asian, 1.9% from other races, and 1.0% from two or more races. Those of Hispanic or Latino origin made up 3.2% of the population. In terms of ancestry, 14.1% were Irish, 8.5% were German, 8.1% were American, and 7.2% were English.

Of the 1,872 households, 40.2% had children under the age of 18 living with them, 52.5% were married couples living together, 13.8% had a female householder with no husband present, 28.7% were non-families, and 25.6% of all households were made up of individuals. The average household size was 2.68 and the average family size was 3.24. The median age was 37.1 years.

The median income for a household in the county was $35,096 and the median income for a family was $47,234. Males had a median income of $37,339 versus $30,761 for females. The per capita income for the county was $16,122. About 12.4% of families and 19.2% of the population were below the poverty line, including 20.8% of those under age 18 and 16.6% of those age 65 or over.

2020 census

As of the 2020 United States census, there were 4,547 people, 1,864 households, and 1,452 families residing in the county.

Communities

City
 Ellaville (county seat)

Unincorporated communities
 La Crosse
 Murrays Crossroads

Politics

See also

 National Register of Historic Places listings in Schley County, Georgia
Hanging of Charles Blackman
List of counties in Georgia

References

 
Georgia (U.S. state) counties
1857 establishments in Georgia (U.S. state)
Americus, Georgia micropolitan area
Populated places established in 1857